Tom Davies (born 10 March 1993) is a Welsh rugby union player who plays as a prop forward. Davies played for Cardiff Blues under 18's before joining the Dragons in July 2016.  He is a Wales under-20 international. He was released by the Dragons regional team at the end of the 2017-18 season.

References

External links 
Dragons profile

1993 births
Living people
Cardiff Rugby players
Dragons RFC players
Rugby union players from Pontypridd
Welsh rugby union players
Rugby union props